Nai Roshni is an Indian drama film directed by L. Mehta and Chiman Kant Gandhi. It was released in 1941 under the banner of                             National Studios. The film also had Baby Meena (Meena Kumari) as a child artist.

A silent film with the same name was released in 1930. Another film with this name was released in 1967. It starrs Mala Sinha, Ashok Kumar and Biswajeet.

References

External links
 
 

1941 films
1940s Hindi-language films
Indian black-and-white films